Louis Déprez (6 January 1921 – 27 July 1999) was a French racing cyclist. He rode in the 1947, 1948 and 1949 Tour de France. Déprez was the winner of initial Four Days of Dunkirk race in 1955.

References

External links

1921 births
1999 deaths
French male cyclists
Sportspeople from Pas-de-Calais
Cyclists from Hauts-de-France